Staniszewo may refer to the following places:
Staniszewo, Greater Poland Voivodeship (west-central Poland)
Staniszewo, Pomeranian Voivodeship (north Poland)
Staniszewo, Warmian-Masurian Voivodeship (north Poland)